Esther is the eponymous heroine of the Book of Esther.

Esther may also refer to:

People
 Esther (given name), a feminine given name
 Colin Esther (born 1989), a Seychellois footballer
 Frédéric Esther (born 1972), a French boxer

Places
 Esther, Missouri, the former name of Park Hills, Missouri, a city
 Esther, Alberta, an unincorporated community
 Esther, Louisiana, an unincorporated community
 Esther Township, Polk County, Minnesota, a township
 Estherville, Iowa, a city
 Estherville Township, Emmet County, Iowa
 Esther Mountain
 Esther Park, a suburb of Kempton Park, Gauteng
 Esther Harbour, a harbor on the coast of King George Island, South Shetland Islands
 Esther Island (Alaska), an island

Media

Literature
 Book of Esther, one of the books of the Hebrew Bible
 Esther (play), a play by Jean Racine (1689)
 Esther (novel), a novel by Henry Adams (1884)
 Esther, a novel by Rosa Nouchette Carey
 Esther, a character in the novel Ben-Hur: A Tale of the Christ
 Esther Lyon, a character in the novel Felix Holt, the Radical
 Esther McQueen, a character in the Honorverse novel series
 Esther Van Gobseck, a character in the novel Splendeurs et misères des courtisanes

Film, TV, and gaming
 Esther (1916 film), a silent film
 Esther (1986 film), an Israeli film
 Esther (1999 film), a television film starring Louise Lombard and F. Murray Abraham 
 Esther, the lead character from The Book of Esther (2013 film)
 Esther (TV series), a British talk show
 Esther, the main character from the film Orphan (2009) and Orphan: First Kill, the latter of which was previously titled Esther.
 Esther, a character from the video game Dear Esther
 Esther ('Esta'), a character played by Sara Asiya in the British web-series Corner Shop Show
 Esther Anderson (Sanford and Son), a character from the television series Sanford and Son
 Esther Blanchett, a major character in the anime Trinity Blood
 Esther Bloom, a character from the soap opera Hollyoaks
 Esther Clavin, a character from the sitcom Cheers
 Esther Drummond, a character from the television programme Torchwood
 Esther Greenwood, the protagonist in Sylvia Plath's semi-autobiographical novel, The Bell Jar
 Esther Hayes, a character from the soap opera Coronation Street
 Esther Samuels, a character from the soap opera Shortland Street
 Esther Valentine, a character from the soap opera The Young and the Restless

Music
 Esther, an opera by Nicolaus Adam Strungk (1680)
 Esther (Handel), an oratorio by George Frideric Handel (1718)
 Esther (Meyerowitz opera), 1956
 Esther (Weisgall opera), an opera composed by Hugo Weisgall
 Little Esther (album), a jazz piano album by Horace Parlan
 "Esther", a song by Sara Groves from the album The Other Side of Something

Other media
 Esther (Millais painting), an 1865 painting by Millais
 Queen Esther (painting), an 1878 painting by Edwin Long
 Mural called Xola located in Tribeca (Manhattan), inspired by Esther Mahlangu, detailing intricate designs of the Ndebele tribe in South Africa

Science and technology
 Hypagyrtis esther, a species of moth
 Olivella esther, a species of sea snail
 Geckobia estherae, a species of gecko parasite
 Hurricane Esther, a 1961 hurricane that affected the East Coast of the United States
 Tropical Storm Esther (1957)
 Cyclone Esther (1983)
 622 Esther, a main-belt asteroid
 Esther (C5J), a CPU core used in the low-power VIA C7 CPU

Other uses
 Fast of Esther, a fast observed on Purim eve
 Esther Martinez Native American Languages Preservation Act (2006)
 Lady Esther, a trademark of a cosmetic manufacturing company
 Esther (1794 ship)

See also
 Ester (disambiguation)
 Hadassah (disambiguation)
 Queen Esther (disambiguation)